Page County is located in the Commonwealth of Virginia. As of the 2020 census, the population was 23,709. Its county seat is Luray.  Page County was formed in 1831 from Shenandoah and Rockingham counties and was named for John Page, Governor of Virginia from 1802 to 1805.

Geography
The highest point in Page County is Hawksbill Mountain, which is located along the border with Madison County within Shenandoah National Park.

Adjacent counties
 Shenandoah County – northwest
 Warren County – north
 Rappahannock County – east
 Madison County – southeast
 Greene County – southeast
 Rockingham County – south

National protected area
 George Washington National Forest (part)
 Shenandoah National Park (part)

Major highways

 
 
 Skyline Drive

Demographics

2020 census 

Note: the US Census treats Hispanic/Latino as an ethnic category. This table excludes Latinos from the racial categories and assigns them to a separate category. Hispanics/Latinos can be of any race.

2000 Census
As of the census of 2000, there were 23,177 people, 9,305 households, and 6,634 families residing in the county.  The population density was 74 people per square mile (29/km2).  There were 10,557 housing units at an average density of 34 per square mile (13/km2).  The racial makeup of the county was 96.65% White, 2.61% Black or African American, 0.15% Native American, 0.24% Asian, 0.03% Pacific Islander, 0.48% from other races, and 0.68% from two or more races.  1.08% of the population were Hispanic or Latino of any race.

There were 9,305 households, out of which 29.60% had children under the age of 18 living with them, 55.80% were married couples living together, 10.50% had a female householder with no husband present, and 28.70% were non-families. 24.40% of all households were made up of individuals, and 11.10% had someone living alone who was 65 years of age or older.  The average household size was 2.46 and the average family size was 2.91.

In the county, the population was spread out, with 23.00% under the age of 18, 7.70% from 18 to 24, 28.30% from 25 to 44, 25.30% from 45 to 64, and 15.70% who were 65 years of age or older.  The median age was 39 years. For every 100 females there were 96.20 males.  For every 100 females age 18 and over, there were 94.40 males.

The median income for a household in the county was $33,359, and the median income for a family was $39,005. Males had a median income of $27,199 versus $19,821 for females. The per capita income for the county was $16,321.  About 10.10% of families and 12.50% of the population were below the poverty line, including 16.00% of those under age 18 and 14.70% of those age 65 or over.

Communities

Towns
 Luray
 Shenandoah
 Stanley

Unincorporated communities

Education

K-12
Page County has a total of 8 public schools: 4 elementary schools, 2 middle schools and 2 high schools. 

In addition to the public schools, Page County has a Technical Center with programs in: 

 Automotive Technology
 Cosmetology
 Electricity
 Welding
 Health Sciences

Higher Education
Laurel Ridge Community College's Luray-Page County Center is located in Luray, which provides college and workforce development classes.  Jenkins Hall features more than 13,000 square feet of educational space, including classrooms, science and health labs, a trades lab, student commons, and administrative offices. 

The college in Luray is a satellite site for a physical therapy assistant degree program, plus phlebotomy, medical office assistant, HVAC, and heavy equipment operator classes. 

Students can earn an Associate Degree in many different subjects, or can take general education classes to transfer into a four-year university.

Politics
Since 1940, Page County has been a stronghold for the Republican Party in presidential elections.

The Page County Board of Supervisors has six members, one from each voting district and one at-large chairman.

Notable residents
 Arthur William Aleshire (February 15, 1900 – March 11, 1940) was a U.S. Representative from Ohio.
 Edward Mallory "Ned" Almond (December 12, 1892 – June 11, 1979) was a controversial United States Army general best known as the commander of the Army's X Corps during the Korean War.
 Floyd Wilson Baker (October 10, 1916 – November 17, 2004) was a third baseman in Major League Baseball who played for the St. Louis Browns (1943–1944), Chicago White Sox (1945–1951), Washington Senators, (1952–1953), Boston Red Sox (1953–1954) and Philadelphia Phillies (1954–1955).
 William Randolph Barbee (January 17, 1818 – June 16, 1868) was an American sculptor recognized for creating idealized, sentimental classical figures.
 Herbert Barbee (October 8, 1848 – March 22, 1936) was an American sculptor.
 Peter Bouck Borst (June 23, 1826 – April 24, 1882) was an active participant in the mid-19th century development of Page County, Virginia, serving as a lawyer, county delegate to Virginia's Secession Convention of 1861, and president of the Shenandoah Valley Railroad.
 Patrick Henry Brittan (September 21, 1815 – March 18, 1868) was quartermaster general of Alabama (1857–59) and 10th Secretary of State for Alabama (1860–65).
 Wayne Comer (born February 3, 1944) is a former Major League Baseball player.
 Charles Frederick Crisp (January 29, 1845 – October 23, 1896) was a United States political figure. A Democrat, he was elected as a Congressman from Georgia in 1882, and served until his death in 1896. From 1890 until his death, he was leader of the Democratic Party in the House, as either the House Minority Leader or the Speaker of the House. He was also the father of Charles R. Crisp who also served in Congress.
 William Alexander Harris Sr. (August 24, 1805 – March 28, 1864) was a U.S. Representative from Virginia, father of William A. Harris.
 William Alexander Harris (October 29, 1841 – December 20, 1909) was a United States Representative and Senator from Kansas.
 Benjamin Franklin Huffman (July 18, 1914 – February 22, 2005) was a catcher in Major League Baseball.
 Thomas Jordan (September 30, 1819 – November 27, 1895) was a Confederate general and major operative in the network of Confederate spies during the American Civil War. A West Point graduate and career soldier in the armies of three nations, he fought in numerous wars and rebellions in the United States, Mexico, and Cuba. Jordan was also a newspaper editor and author.
 Donald Edward Keyhoe (June 20, 1897 – November 29, 1988) was an American Marine Corps naval aviator, writer of many aviation articles and stories in a variety of leading publications, and manager of the promotional tours of aviation pioneers, especially of Charles Lindbergh.
 Robert Franklin Leedy (July 28, 1863 – January 12, 1924) was a lawyer, soldier, and Virginia state legislator.
 William Milnes Jr. (December 8, 1827 – August 14, 1889) was a nineteenth-century congressman and industrialist from Virginia and Pennsylvania.
 Kenneth R. Plum (November 3, 1941 – ) is a member of the Virginia House of Delegates.
 George Quaintance (June 3, 1902 – November 8, 1957) was an artist from Page County, Virginia.
 Henry Ruffner (January 16, 1790 – December 17, 1861) was an educator and Presbyterian minister, who served as president of Washington College (now Washington and Lee University).
 Bethany Veney (c. 1813 – November 16, 1916), also known as Aunt Betty, was an African-American slave. Her autobiography was published 1889.
 William Overall Yager (April 3, 1833 – 1904) was, during the American Civil War, the commanding officer of the 1st Texas Cavalry, and, in postwar years, member of the Virginia House of Delegates and the Senate of Virginia, Superintendent of Schools, and Treasurer for Page County, Virginia.

See also
 National Register of Historic Places listings in Page County, Virginia
 USS Page County (LST-1076)

References

External links

 Page County, Virginia Genealogy
 Page County Government's official website
 Page County Blog Page County's Official Blog Website
 Page County Heritage Association Page County's non-profit historical society

 
Virginia counties
1831 establishments in Virginia
Populated places established in 1831